Grand Arena is located south of Bucharest in Berceni district, at the crossroad between Turnu Măgurele Street, Metalurgiei Boulevard and Gilăului Road, in the proximity of a large do-it-yourself store and cash and carry. 

It is anchored by Carrefour Hypermarket and it is served by an underground parking lot with approximately 2,000 car places.

References

Shopping malls in Bucharest